The Last Gospel is the name given to the prologue of the Gospel of John (John 1:1–14) when read as part of the concluding rites in the Ordinariate or the Extraordinary forms of the Catholic Mass. The Prologue speaks on Jesus Christ as the Logos and on the Incarnation. The Last Gospel was included as an option for the Ordinariate Form of Mass but not included in the Ordinary Form of Mass.

Description
The Last Gospel began as a private devotional practice on the priest's part, known well in the Sarum Rite in Catholic England, but was gradually absorbed into the rubrics of the Mass. Immediately after the blessing, the priest goes to the Gospel side of the altar, beginning with the Dominus vobiscum as at the Proclamation of the Gospel during Mass. However, as the priest reads from an altar card, he makes a Sign of the Cross with his right thumb on the altar's surface instead of the Gospel text, before signing his own forehead, lips, and chest. At the words  ("And the Word became flesh"), the priest (and, if present, the congregation) genuflects.

The text of the Gospel of John is perhaps best known for its opening, which in most English translations has been rendered as "In the beginning was the Word, and the Word was with God, and the Word was God."

The third Mass of Christmas Day, where this same Gospel is read as the Gospel of the Mass, has no Last Gospel; before 1954, the Gospel for the Feast of the Epiphany would be read here. A superseded Mass, e.g. a Saint's feast superseded by a Sunday, could also be commemorated by, among other things, having its Gospel as the Last Gospel.

The Armenian Rite, used by both the Armenian Apostolic Church and the Armenian Catholic Church, adopted the Last Gospel, a legacy of the period of intense interactions between Crusaders and the Armenian Kingdom of Cilicia.

References and sources
 

Gospel of John
Tridentine Mass
Order of Mass